Macarthur Adventist College is an independent Seventh-day Adventist co-educational early learning, primary and secondary day school, located in the south-western Sydney suburb of Macquarie Fields, New South Wales, Australia. It is a part of the Seventh-day Adventist education system, the world's second largest Christian school system.

Location
The school is situated at 12 Victoria Road, Macquarie Fields, a suburb in south-western Sydney. The school is only a short walk from both Macquarie Fields Train Station and Glenfield Train Station which are part of the T8 Airport & South Line. There is also a public bus stop directly outside the front gates  which services the local suburbs and surrounds.

Curriculum
The school's curriculum consists primarily of the standard courses taught at college preparatory schools across the world. All students are required to take classes in the core areas of English, Basic Sciences, Mathematics, a Foreign Language, and Social Sciences.

Spiritual aspects
All students take religion classes each year that they are enrolled. These classes cover topics in biblical history and Christian and denominational doctrines. Instructors in other disciplines also begin each class period with prayer or a short devotional thought, many which encourage student input. Weekly, the entire student body gathers together in the auditorium for an hour-long chapel service.
Outside the classrooms there is year-round spiritually oriented programming that relies on student involvement.

Sports
All students are expected to participate in a sport during the designated time two periods a week. Some of the sports the school offers include basketball, soccer, volleyball, rugby, netball, swimming, Austag, touch football, tennis, and table tennis. Some sports are changed each term to suit the seasons.

See also

 List of Seventh-day Adventist secondary schools
 Seventh-day Adventist education
 List of non-government schools in New South Wales

References

External links 
 

1974 establishments in Australia
Adventist secondary schools in Australia
Educational institutions established in 1974
Private secondary schools in Sydney
Adventist primary schools in Australia
Private primary schools in Sydney
Macquarie Fields, New South Wales